This is a timeline of artists, albums, and events in progressive rock and its subgenres. This article contains the timeline for the period 2020–.

2020

Newly formed bands 

The Smile

Reformed bands 

 Genesis
 Vektor
Liquid Tension Experiment

Bands on hiatus 

 Anathema

Albums

Disbandments

Events 

 Drummer and lyricist Neil Peart of Rush died on January 7 at the age of 67 after fighting brain cancer for over three years.
 Sean Reinert, drummer for Cynic and Gordian Knot, died on January 24 at 48.
 Coheed and Cambria planned their inaugural S.S. Neverender cruise for October 26–30 with other prog bands such as The Dear Hunter, Polyphia, and Thank You Scientist; the event was postponed to 2021 due to the COVID-19 pandemic.
 The COVID-19 pandemic significantly impacts the music industry, particularly disrupting concerts and tours. Tool, Roger Waters, King Crimson, and Coheed and Cambria postpone part or all of their 2020 tours, and Steven Wilson postpones the release of his sixth solo studio album until early 2021.
 Florian Schneider, co-founder of Kraftwerk, died of cancer on April 21 at 73.
 Cardiacs frontman Tim Smith died on July 22 at 59.

2021

Reformed bands 

 Porcupine Tree

Albums

Disbandments

Events 

 Chick Corea, American jazz fusion keyboardist and founder of fusion band Return to Forever, died of cancer on February 9 at the age of 79.
Coheed and Cambria's S.S. Neverender cruise, featuring other prog bands such as The Dear Hunter, Polyphia, and Thank You Scientist, set sail from October 25 through 29, after being postponed from the previous year due to the COVID-19 pandemic.
David Longdon, the lead singer, multi-instrumentalist, and frontman of Big Big Train, died on November 20 in a tragic accident at the age of 56.

2022

Reformed bands 

 The Mars Volta
 Zero Hour

Albums

Disbandments 

 The Birds of Satan
 Procol Harum

Events 

 King Crimson's founding drummer Ian McDonald died on February 9 at 75, a week after the release of the trailer for a King Crimson documentary, in which McDonald apologized to Robert Fripp for leaving the band back in 1969.
 Gary Brooker, the founder, lead singer, principal songwriter, and sole continuous member of Procol Harum, died at the age of 76 on February 19.
 Taylor Hawkins (The Birds of Satan, Coheed and Cambria) was found dead at 50 in a hotel room in Bogotá, Colombia on March 26. An initial toxicology report showed the presence of 10 substances in his body; however, no official cause of death was disclosed.
 Klaus Schulze, Prominent electronic music pioneer and drummer for Krautrock bands Ash Ra Tempel, The Cosmic Jokers, and Tangerine Dream, died on April 26 at the age of 74.
 Progressive electronic composer and Aphrodite's Child keyboardist Vangelis died on May 17 at 79 due to COVID-19 complications.
 Yes drummer Alan White died at the age of 72 on May 26.
 Massimo Morante of Goblin died on June 23 at 69.

See also 
 Timeline of progressive rock: other decades: 1960s – 1970s – 1980s – 1990s – 2000s – 2010s
 Timeline of progressive rock (Parent article)
 Progressive rock
 Canterbury Scene
 Symphonic rock
 Avant-rock
 Rock in Opposition
 Neo-prog
 Progressive metal
 Jazz fusion
 Djent

References 

Progressive rock
Progressive rock
Progressive rock
2020s in music
Music history by genre